The Shanghai Art Museum was an art museum in the city of Shanghai, China. In October 2012, the museum was rebranded as the China Art Museum when it moved to the China pavilion at Expo 2010 on the former Shanghai Expo 2010 lands. The Shanghai Art Museum building is the former clubhouse building of the Shanghai Race Club. It sits on the western edge of People's Park, north of People's Square, which was once the Shanghai race course. The Shanghai Art Museum was the original home of the Shanghai Biennale, founded in 1996 by Fang Zengxian, then director of the museum. The former museum building is being converted to house the Shanghai History Museum, which had been left without a home due to redevelopment since 1999.

History of the Shanghai Art Museum building
The Shanghai Art Museum building is located on the south side of Nanjing Road (West). The building has an area of 2,200 sq m.

The building was constructed in 1933, as the clubhouse for the Shanghai Race Club race course. The horse race course was reputed to be the third most profitable industry during the 1930s (during the Republic of China era).

In 1955, the building was renovated and a terrace was constructed on the roof. The goal was mainly to enable the architects to build wider stairs leading to the clock tower, so that youth can easily visit the tower.

The building has one of the most prominent clock towers in the city after the Customs House clock tower on the Bund. The clock tower at the Art Museum has historically been associated with decay and corruption in the city, as it was often inaccurate. However, it was renovated in 2006 and has been accurate since then.

Events
Shanghai Art Museum was the home to the Shanghai Biennale, which started from 1996. The Shanghai Biennale is considered one of the most important cultural events in Shanghai. In 2012, the Shanghai Biennale moved to the new Power Station of Art.

See also

 List of museums in China

Notes

References

External links

 Museum website

Buildings and structures completed in 1933
Museums established in 1956
2012 disestablishments in China
Museums in Shanghai
Art museums and galleries in China
Defunct art museums and galleries
Huangpu District, Shanghai